Mycobacterium palustre is a slowly growing mycobacterium first isolated from an environmental source in Finland.  It is potentially pathogenic, and has been isolated from human and veterinary clinical specimens.

Type strain
First isolated from water from a stream in Finland.
Strain E846 = ATCC BAA-377 = DSM 44572.

References

External links
Type strain of Mycobacterium palustre at BacDive -  the Bacterial Diversity Metadatabase

Acid-fast bacilli
palustre
Bacteria described in 2002